American singer and songwriter Angie Stone has released eight studio albums, one compilation album, and more than two dozen singles. She has sold near five million records as a solo artist, including over 1.4 million albums in the United States. Stone's career began as a member of the hip hop trio The Sequence in the late 1970s. In 1999, she released her first solo album, Black Diamond (2003) on Arista Records. It debuted at number 46 on the US Billboard 200 and peaked at number nine on the Top R&B/Hip-Hop Albums, eventually selling more than 750,000 copies. Black Diamond was awarded gold by the Recording Industry Association of America (RIAA) and the British Phonographic Industry (BPI), and produced the singles "No More Rain (In This Cloud)", "Life Story" and "Everyday", the former of which became a number-one hit on the Adult R&B Songs chart.

Following her transition to J Records, Stone released her second album  Mahogany Soul. Another gold-seller in the United Kingdom and United States, it peaked at number four on the US Top R&B/Hip-Hop Albums, while reaching the top twenty of the Dutch, Finnish and Flemish Album Charts. Mahogany Soul sold more than 1.2 million copies worldwide, and produced four singles, including "Brotha" and its remix version featuring Alicia Keys and Eve as well as the international hit single "Wish I Didn't Miss You", which marked her first chart topper on the US Dance Club Songs. Stone Love, Stone's third album, was released in June 2004 and debuted at number 14 on the US Billboard 200, selling 53,000 copies in its first week of release. Her highest-charting international success, it entered the top twenty in Belgium, Finland, Sweden and the Netherlands. Its release was preceded by the single "I Wanna Thank Ya" featuring Snoop Dogg, a top five hit in Belgium and Stone's second chart topper on the US Dance Club Songs.

In 2005, Stone began recording what as expected to become her fourth regular album, but was eventually transferred to her first compilation album Stone Hits: The Very Best of Angie Stone which compromised songs from her first three albums. With "I Wasn't Kidding", the album produced one single. Following her departure from J Records, Stone signed with Stax Records and released The Art of Love & War. The album debuted at number eleven on the US Billboard 200, selling 45,000 copies in its first week, becoming Stone's highest-charting album in the United States, as well as her first and only album to top the Top R&B/Hip-Hop Albums chart. Lead single "Baby", a duet with Betty Wright, became her second number-one hit on the US Adult R&B Songs and was followed by two further singles. Elsewhere, The Art of Love & War failed to chart noticeably. Stone's second effort with Stax, her fifth studio album Unexpected, was released in November 2009. A commercial failure, the album debuted and peaked at number 133 on the US Billboard 200. "I Ain't Hearin' U", the album's lead single reached number 14 on Billboards Adult R&B Songs.

Rich Girl, Stone's sixth album, was released to similar success. Issued by Saguaro Road Records following another label change, it peaked at number 15 on Billboards Top R&B/Hip-Hop Albums. The album spawned two singles, including "Do What U Gotta Do" which reached number 13 on the US Adult R&B Songs. In 2015, Stone signed with Shanachie Records to release her seventh album Dream with the company. Her highest-charting effort since 2007's  The Art of Love & War, it debuted and peaked at number 59 on the US Billboard 200 and number three on the Top R&B/Hip-Hop Albums chart. The album produced two singles, including "2 Bad Habits." The following year, Stone recorded and released her next studio album Covered in Soul through Goldenlane Records which compromised cover versions of popular Phil Collins, Hot Chocolate, and Neil Diamond songs. Preceded by the single "These Eyes", a cover of the same-titled The Guess Who song, it failed to chart. Full Circle, Stone's ninth studio album, is set for a July 12, 2019 release.

Albums

Studio albums

Compilation albums

Singles

As lead artist

As a featured artist

Promotional singles

Other charted songs

Other appearances

Album appearances

Other collaborations

Soundtrack appearances

Music videography

Notes

References

External links
 

Discographies of American artists
Rhythm and blues discographies